The Shuwaymiya mine is one of the largest gypsum mines in Oman. The mine is located outside the small fishing village of Shuwaymiyah (الشويمية) in the southeast of the Dhofar Governorate. The mine has reserves amounting to 165 million tonnes of gypsum.

See also

References 

Gypsum mines in Oman